Prathibha Devisingh Patil (born 19 December 1934) is an Indian politician and lawyer who served as the 12th president of India spanning from 2007 to 2012. She is the first woman to become the president of India. A member of the Indian National Congress, she previously served as the Governor of Rajasthan from 2004 to 2007, and was a member of Lok Sabha from 1991 to 1996.

Early life
Patil was born in a Marathi family on 19 December 1934 in the village of  Nadgaon in Jalgaon, Maharashtra. She is the daughter of Narayan Rao Patil. She was educated initially at R. R. Vidyalaya town and subsequently was awarded a master's degree in Political Science and Economics by Mooljee Jetha College, Jalgaon (then under Poona University), and then a Bachelor of Law degree by Government Law College, Bombay, affiliated to the University of Bombay (now University of Mumbai). Patil then began to practice law at the Jalgaon District Court, while also taking interest in social issues such as improving the conditions faced by Indian women.

Patil married Devisingh Ramsingh Shekhawat on 7 July 1965. The couple has a daughter, Jyoti Rathore and a son, Raosaheb Shekhawat, who is also a politician.

Political career
In 1962, at the age of 27, she was elected to the Maharashtra Legislative Assembly for the Jalgaon constituency. Thereafter she won in the Muktainagar (formerly Edlabad) constituency on four consecutive occasions between 1967 and 1985, before becoming a Member of Parliament in the Rajya Sabha between 1985 and 1990. In the 1991 elections for the 10th Lok Sabha, she was elected as a Member of Parliament representing the Amravati constituency. A period of retirement from politics followed later in the decade.

Patil had held various Cabinet portfolios during her period in the Maharashtra Legislative Assembly and she had also held official positions while in both the Rajya Sabha and Lok Sabha. In addition, she had been for some years the president of the Maharashtra Pradesh Congress Committee and also held office as Director of the National Federation of Urban Co-operative Banks and Credit Societies and as a Member of the Governing Council of the National Co-operative Union of India.

On 8 November 2004 she was appointed the 17th Governor of Rajasthan, the first woman to hold that office.

Presidential election 

Patil was announced as the United Progressive Alliance (UPA) candidate on 14 June 2007. She emerged as a compromise candidate after the left-wing parties of the alliance would not agree to the nomination of former Home Minister Shivraj Patil or Karan Singh. Patil had been loyal to the INC and the Nehru–Gandhi family for decades and this was considered to be a significant factor in her selection by INC leader Sonia Gandhi, although Patil said that she had no intention of being a "rubber-stamp president".

In the same month that she was selected, as a member of the UPA Patil was accused of shielding her brother, G. N. Patil, in the 2005 Vishram Patil murder case. Vishram Patil had narrowly defeated G. N. Patil in an election to be the President of the District Congress Committee of Jalgaon and in September of that year had been murdered. Vishram Patil's widow eventually accused G. N. Patil of involvement in the crime and claimed that Pratibha Patil had influenced the criminal investigation and that the issue needed to be examined before presidential immunity became active. Her accusations were rejected by the courts in 2009 but in 2015 G. N. Patil was charged. No reference to the alleged involvement of Pratibha Patil was made at this time.

Due to the presidential role being largely a figurehead position, the selection of the candidate is often arranged by consensus among the various political parties and the candidate runs unopposed. Contrary to the normal pattern of events, Patil faced a challenge in the election. The BBC described the situation as "the latest casualty of the country's increasingly partisan politics and [it] highlights what is widely seen as an acute crisis of leadership". It "degenerated into unseemly mudslinging between the ruling party and the opposition". Her challenger was Bhairon Singh Shekhawat, the incumbent vice-president and a Bharatiya Janata Party (BJP) veteran. Shekhawat stood as an independent candidate and was supported by the National Democratic Alliance (NDA), a group led by the BJP, although the Shiv Sena party, which was a part of NDA, supported her because of her Marathi origin.

Those opposed to Patil becoming president claimed that she lacked charisma, experience, and ability. They also highlighted her time spent away from high-level politics and queried her belief in the supernatural, such as her claim to have received a message from Dada Lekhraj, a dead guru. Various specific issues were raised, such as a comment made by her in 1975 that those suffering from hereditary diseases should be sterilized. Another alleged that while a Member of Parliament for Amravati she diverted Rs 3.6 million from her MPLADS fund to a trust run by her husband. This was in violation of Government rules which barred MPs from providing funds to organization's run by their relatives. The parliamentary affairs minister denied any wrongdoing on Patils'  part, and noted that the funds are used under MPLADS,  by the Comptroller and Auditor General of India.

Patil won the election held on 19 July 2007. She garnered nearly two-thirds of the votes and took oath on 25 July 2007, as India's 12th president but 1st woman President.

Presidency 

Patil's term as the President of India saw various controversies and is widely considered as lacklustre. She commuted death sentences of 35 petitioners to life, a record. President's Office, however, defended this by saying that President had granted clemency to the petitioners after due consideration and examining the advice of the Home Ministry.

Patil was noted for having spent more money on foreign trips, and having taken a greater number of foreign trips, than any previous president. Sometimes accompanied by as many as 11 members of her family, there had been 12 foreign trips spanning 22 countries by May 2012, when she was away on her 13th trip. Those completed travels had cost Rs 205 crore (Rs 2.05 billion). The Ministry of External Affairs said that taking family members "was not abnormal".

The Office of President has a five-year term and Patil retired from the role in July 2012.

Patil allegedly used public funds to build a retirement mansion on a  plot of military land in Pune. Tradition is that a retiring president either takes residence in Government accommodation in Delhi or moves back to their residence in their home state; her use of government money to build a retirement home at the end of the presidential term was unprecedented. Other controversies that arose after her retirement included her desire to claim both an official government car and fuel allowance for the running of a private car, despite rules clearly stipulating that this was an either/or situation. She also took possession of many gifts that had been given to her in her official role and was later forced to return them.

Business interests
Patil set up Vidya Bharati Shikshan Prasarak Mandal, an educational institute which runs a chain of schools and colleges in Amravati, Jalgaon, Pune and Mumbai. She also set up Shram Sadhana Trust, which runs hostels for working women in New Delhi, Mumbai and Pune; and an engineering college for rural students in Jalgaon district. She also co-founded a cooperative sugar factory known as Sant Muktabai Sahakari Sakhar Karkhana at Muktainagar.

In addition, Patil founded a cooperative bank, Pratibha Mahila Sahakari Bank, that ceased trading in February 2003 when its licence was cancelled by the Reserve Bank of India. Among other failings, the bank had given illegal loans to her relatives that exceeded the bank's share capital. It had also given a loan to her sugar mill which was never repaid. The bank waived these loans, and this drove it into liquidation. The government liquidator of the bank, P. D. Nigam, said, "The fact that relatives of the founder chairperson (Pratibha Patil) were among those indiscriminately granted loans and that some illegal loan waivers were done has come up in our audit." Six of the top ten defaulters in the bank were linked to her relatives. The INC claimed that Patil had not been involved with the bank since 1994 but The Indian Express reported that it had official documents showing her involvement as late as 2002.

Positions held
Pratibha Patil has held various official offices during her career. These are:

Honours
  : Grand Cross, Special Class of the Order of the Aztec Eagle (awarded 3 August 2018 - presented 1 June 2019).

References

External links

 President of India Official Site
 ex-President of India Pratibha Patil's Official Site 
 ex-President Pratibha Patil's Personal Site (www.pratibha patil.info)

|-

|-

 
1934 births
India MPs 1991–1996
20th-century Indian women politicians
20th-century Indian politicians
21st-century Indian women politicians
21st-century Indian politicians
Deputy Chairman of the Rajya Sabha
Educators from Maharashtra
Female heads of state
Governors of Rajasthan
Indian National Congress politicians from Maharashtra
Women educators from Maharashtra
Leaders of the Opposition in the Maharashtra Legislative Assembly
Living people
Lok Sabha members from Maharashtra
Marathi people
People from Amravati
People from Jalgaon district
Presidents of India
Rajya Sabha members from Maharashtra
Women members of the Rajya Sabha
Women presidents
Women state governors of India
Women members of the Lok Sabha